Elk Fork is a stream in Bates County in the U.S. state of Missouri. It is a tributary of South Grand River.

Elk Fork was so named on account of elk in the area.

See also
List of rivers of Missouri

References

Rivers of Bates County, Missouri
Rivers of Missouri